Herr von Ribbeck auf Ribbeck im Havelland is a popular literary ballad written by the German poet and novelist Theodor Fontane in 1889. Up to today, the poem is published in German anthologies and learned in schools.

Content 
The poem tells of a member of the German lower Uradel nobility, named in the title (Squire von Ribbeck, his family name; auf Ribbeck, residing on Ribbeck manor (today part of Nauen); im Havelland, in the Havelland region). Von Ribbeck is described as gentle and generous; he often gives away pears from his pear trees to children passing by, addressing them in a friendly Brandenburgisch dialect. But he knows his son and heir to be a scrooge; so when von Ribbeck feels his end near, he asks that a pear be put into his grave. This pear quickly grows into a pear-tree, which now provides free pears to the children, thus preserving the heritage of the late von Ribbeck.

History 

The Ribbeck family of Brandenburgian nobles has been attested since 1237; they were mentioned as owners of the Ribbeck estates in the 1375 register of Emperor Charles IV. The legend of kind-hearted Hans-Georg von Ribbeck (1689–1759) and his pear-tree first appeared in a collection of fairy tales published in 1887. Fontane used this text as a base for his poem, which he wrote in summer 1889.

Popularity 
More than 100 years after its initial publication, the poem is still very popular in Germany. It is available as a picture book in several editions, and has been featured on children's TV series Die Sendung mit der Maus. It is the subject of common classroom study in German schools. The poem has also been the subject of many scholarly reviews.

In 2007, Fontane's original manuscript of the poem was sold for 130,000 Euros at an auction in Berlin.

References

External links 

Translations of the poem into English and other languages

1889 poems
German poems
Works by Theodor Fontane